Neeskens is both a given name and surname. Notable people with the name include:

 Johan Neeskens (born 1951), Dutch football manager and player
 John Neeskens (born 1993), American soccer player
 Neeskens Kebano (born 1992), French-born Congolese footballer